Mayis Azizyan (born 1 May 1978) is an Armenian professional footballer.

External links
 

1978 births
Living people
Armenian footballers
Expatriate footballers in Iran
Armenian expatriate footballers
Armenia international footballers
FC Ararat Yerevan players
Bargh Shiraz players
Ulisses FC players
FC Mika players
FC Impuls Dilijan players
F.C. Aboomoslem players
Armenian Premier League players
Association football goalkeepers